Americana Master Series: Best of the Sugar Hill Years is the title of a recording by American folk music and country blues artist Doc Watson, released in 2008.

Reception

Writing for Allmusic, music critic Steve Leggett wrote of the album "Any of Watson's many Sugar Hill albums is well worth checking out on its own, but this succinct sampler of some of the wonderful moments from those albums is proof of how Watson makes everything he touches fit into his personal and seamless tour of American folk music in all of its interconnected shapes and forms."

Track listing
 "Slidin' Delta" (Mississippi John Hurt) – 2:02
 "My Dear Old Southern Home" (Ellsworth Cozzens, Jimmie Rodgers) – 2:24
 "Country Blues" (Dock Boggs) – 3:25
 "You Must Come in at the Door" (Sunny Skylar, Doc Watson) – 2:16
 "Greenville Trestle High" (James Jett) – 3:29
 "Bright Sunny South" (Traditional) – 2:36
 "Let the Church Roll On" (A. P. Carter) – 2:57
 "My Little Woman, You're So Sweet" (Traditional) – 2:22
 "Watson's Blues" (Bill Monroe) – 3:33
 "Wreck of the Old Number Nine" (Carson Robison) – 2:53
 "Solid Gone" (A. P. Carter) – 3:02
 "Whiskey Before Breakfast" (Traditional) – 2:55
 "What Does the Deep Sea Say?" (Wade Mainer) – 3:31
 "Your Long Journey" (Watson, Watson) – 2:45

Personnel
Doc Watson – vocals, guitar, banjo
Merle Watson – banjo, guitar
Sam Bush – mandolin
T. Michael Coleman – bass, harmony vocals
Buddy Davis – bass
Jerry Douglas – dobro
Stuart Duncan – fiddle
Béla Fleck – banjo
Jack Lawrence – guitar
Alan O'Bryant – harmony vocals
Mark Schatz – bass
Marty Stuart – mandolin
Bryan Sutton – guitar

References

2008 compilation albums
Doc Watson compilation albums
Sugar Hill Records compilation albums